"Redemption Song" is a song by Jamaican singer Bob Marley. It is the final track on Bob Marley and the Wailers' twelfth album, Uprising, produced by Chris Blackwell and released by Island Records. The song is considered one of Marley's greatest works. Some key lyrics derived from a speech given by the Pan-Africanist orator Marcus Garvey titled "The Work That Has Been Done."

At the time he wrote the song, circa 1979, Bob Marley had been diagnosed with the cancer in his toe that took his life a couple of years later. According to Rita Marley, "...he was already secretly in a lot of pain and dealt with his own mortality, a feature that is clearly apparent in the album, particularly in this song."

Unlike most of Bob Marley's other tracks, it is strictly a solo acoustic recording, consisting of his singing and playing an acoustic guitar, without accompaniment. The song is in the key of G major.

"Redemption Song" was released as a single in the UK and France in October 1980 and included a full band rendering of the song. This version has since been included as a bonus track on the 2001 reissue of Uprising, as well as on the 2001 compilation One Love: The Very Best of Bob Marley & The Wailers. Although in live performances the full band was used for the song, the solo recorded performance remains the take most familiar to listeners.

In 2004, Rolling Stone placed the song at number 66 among "The 500 Greatest Songs of All Time". In 2010, the New Statesman listed it as one of the Top 20 Political Songs.

On 5 February 2020 (on the eve of what would have been his 75th birthday), Marley's estate released an official animated video for the song. This also commemorated the 40th anniversary of the song's release.

Personnel
Bob Marley – vocals, acoustic guitar, production

Meaning and influence
The song urges listeners to "Emancipate yourself from mental slavery," because "None but ourselves can free our minds." These lines were taken from a speech given by Marcus Garvey at Menelik Hall in Sydney, Nova Scotia, during October 1937 and published in his Black Man magazine:

In 2009, Jamaican poet and broadcaster Mutabaruka chose "Redemption Song" as the most influential recording in Jamaican music history.

In 2017, "Redemption Song" was featured in series 25 of BBC Radio 4's Soul Music, a documentary series exploring famous pieces of music and their emotional appeal, with contributors including Marley's art director Neville Garrick, Jamaican Poet Laureate Lorna Goodison, Grammy Award-winning artist John Legend, and Wailers guitarist Don Kinsey.

In American Songwriter's 2019 appreciation of the song, Jim Beviglia analyzed the song as being a "departure" from his regular music:Marley was too much a force of nature to lose his personality just because he was in a new setting. The rhythmic ingenuity that marked his career can be heard in the little instrumental breakdown between verses. His vocal also drips with idiosyncratic power, from the way he hiccups his way through some of the lines to give them some extra flavor to his brilliant phrasing of the word “triumphantly.” Other songwriters might have crammed in a few other words just to fit the meter a bit more snugly, but Marley’s choice gives that word added meaning.

Certifications

Covers
Stevie Wonder recorded a cover of the song that was released in 1996 on the album Get on the Bus of the feature film with the same name. It was also released in 1996 on Stevie Wonder compilation album Song Review: A Greatest Hits Collection.

Joe Strummer of The Clash recorded a cover of this song that was released posthumously on the album Streetcore in 2003, which featured his backing band at the time, The Mescaleros. Strummer also covered the song as a duet with Johnny Cash during the later's sessions for the American IV: The Man Comes Around album, this version being released later in the box set Unearthed.

Bono of U2 sung Redemption Song solo acoustic at 16 Zoo TV shows between 1992 and 1993, and him and The Edge have sung it at different events and impromptu performances since then.

John Legend also did a cover of it on Bear Witness, Take Action.

Wyclef Jean performed the song for the 9/11 benefit concert America: A Tribute to Heroes on 21 September 2001.

No Use for a Name also covered this song on their 1995 album ¡Leche con Carne!.

Manfred Mann's Earth Band adapted the song on their album Somewhere in Afrika released in 1982. A shorter version had previously been released as a single. Both arrangements were subtitled "No Kwazulu" and combined Marley's original song with Zulu and Xhosa chants in order to protest Apartheid. The album version also includes a song written by Manfred Mann over the same changes called "Brothers and Sisters of Africa". For live performances, the band opted for an arrangement much closer to Marley's original, as can be heard on the Budapest Live and Mann Alive albums.

References

Further reading

External links

Lorna Goodison Lorna Goodison on the origins and philosophy of "Redemption Song"

1980s ballads
1980 singles
1980 songs
Bob Marley songs
Island Records singles
Protest songs
Songs against racism and xenophobia
Songs about freedom
Songs written by Bob Marley
Christianity in music
Song recordings produced by Chris Blackwell
The Specials songs